Hersch is a German surname. Notable people with the surname include:

Chris Hersch
Fred Hersch, jazz pianist
Jeanne Hersch, Swiss philosopher
Joseph J. Hersch, American politician
Liebmann Hersch, Bund leader and Geneva University professor
Michael Hersch
 Paul Hersch, US physician, inventor of the Hersch cell oxygen detector
Rainer Hersch, British musical comedian

See also
Hirsch (disambiguation)
Hirsh
Hersh
Herschel (disambiguation)

German-language surnames